Judge Davis may refer to:

Andre M. Davis (born 1949), judge of the United States Court of Appeals for the Fourth Circuit
Arthur Marshall Davis (1907–1963), judge of the United States District Court for the District of Arizona
Bancroft Davis (1822–1907), judge of the United States Court of Claims
Brian J. Davis (born 1953), judge of the United States District Court for the Middle District of Florida
Charles B. Davis (1877–1943), judge of the United States District Court for the Eastern District of Missouri
David Jackson Davis (1878–1938), judge of the United States District Court for the Northern District of Alabama
Edward B. Davis (1933–2010), judge of the United States District Court for the Southern District of Florida
John Davis (U.S. district court judge) (1761–1847), judge of the United States District Court for the District of Massachusetts
John Davis (United States Court of Claims judge) (1851–1902), judge of the United States Court of Claims
John Morgan Davis (1906–1984), judge of the United States District Court for the Eastern District of Pennsylvania
John Warren Davis (judge) (1867–1945), judge of the United States Court of Appeals for the Third Circuit
Kathryn C. Davis (born 1978), judge of the United States Court of Federal Claims
Legrome D. Davis (born 1952), judge of the United States District Court for the Eastern District of Pennsylvania
Leonard Davis (judge) (born 1948), judge of the United States District Court for the Eastern District of Texas
Mark Steven Davis (born 1962, judge of the United States District Court for the Eastern District of Virginia
Michael J. Davis (born 1947), judge of the United States District Court for the District of Minnesota
Oscar Hirsh Davis (1914–1988), judge of the United States Court of Appeals for the Federal Circuit
Robert N. Davis (born 1953), judge of the United States Court of Appeals for Veterans Claims
Stephanie D. Davis (born 1967), judge of the United States Court of Appeals for the Sixth Circuit
Thomas Hoyt Davis (1892–1969), judge of the United States District Court for the Middle District of Georgia
W. Eugene Davis (born 1936), judge of the United States Court of Appeals for the Fifth Circuit

See also
Justice Davis (disambiguation)